Kanjur Marg (Marathi pronunciation: [kaɲd͡zuɾmaːɾɡ]) is a suburb in east central Mumbai. Kanjurmarg railway station is the main access point for IIT Bombay, KV Powai, L&T, Hiranandani Gardens, and other locations in Powai. The station was built in 1968 and named after the local Kanjur village.

Colleges
 IIT Bombay
 PACE IIT & Medical Coaching Centre

References

Suburbs of Mumbai